is a cooking school in Yoyogi, Shibuya, Tokyo, Japan.

Hattori Nutrition College offers certification courses and full degree programs in culinary arts and dietetics. There is a particular emphasis on healthy, “body-friendly” culinary techniques.

The principal is Dr. Yukio Hattori, known for his role in the popular Japanese game show Iron Chef. Even before Iron Chef, Hattori Nutrition College was well known for its culinary arts programs. It is now a top choice for any aspiring culinarian in Japan, with an increasing world following as well.

In the Japanese Iron Chef, Hattori Nutrition College students assisted the competing chefs in cooking duties. Dr. Hattori was the show's culinary commentator.

Access
The campus is about a three-minute walk from JR Yoyogi Station and about a five-minute walk from Shinjuku Station.

External links
Hattori Nutrition College 

Cooking schools in Asia
Private universities and colleges in Japan
Universities and colleges in Tokyo